The Testament is a 2006 thriller novel by Eric Van Lustbader.

Plot summary 
The book is about Braverman Shaw, whose father, Dexter Shaw, is killed by an explosion. After his death, Braverman, or Bravo to his friends, finds out that his father was a member of the Gnostic Observant, a group who possess a very old secret of Jesus Christ. Bravo has to find the secret and keep it hidden from their sworn enemies, the Knights of Saint-Clemens. His father left behind a maze, which Bravo has to solve to find the secret. During his journey, he is attacked by the Knights multiple times, and they are closer than he thinks.

References

2006 American novels
American thriller novels
Forge Books books
Novels by Eric Van Lustbader